Graužiai (formerly) is a village in Kėdainiai district municipality, in Kaunas County, in central Lithuania. According to the 2011 census, the village had a population of 24 people. The road Šingaliai-Paliepiai crosses the village.

There is an ancient burial place nearby Graužiai and the Graužiai Treasure has been found in the village in 1939.

Demography

References

Villages in Kaunas County
Kėdainiai District Municipality